Jean-François Coux (born 23 December 1980 in Grenoble, France) is a French rugby union footballer. Coux's first professional club was Vinay whom he played for from 1998 to 1999. He moved to CS Bourgoin-Jallieu for the 1999-2000 Top 14 season and he left them in 2011 to join SU Agen. He mainly plays on the wing.

Representatively he has played for France A - gaining one cap against Ireland A in 2005. He was selected for France in their 2007 Tour to New Zealand. His Test debut came against the All Blacks at Eden Park, Auckland on 2 June 2007. Although France lost 42-11, Coux scored France's only try of the match.

External links

1980 births
French rugby union players
Living people
Rugby union wings
France international rugby union players
Sportspeople from Grenoble